Walter Shapiro is an American journalist, writer and columnist.

Early life and education
Shapiro was born in New York City and was raised in Norwalk, Connecticut. He graduated from Brien McMahon High School in 1965.

Shapiro attended the University of Michigan, where he was an editor of The Michigan Daily; he earned his B.A. in history in 1970. Shapiro completed post-graduate work at the university in European history; as a graduate student, he unsuccessfully ran for the U.S. House of Representatives, finishing second in a six-way Democratic primary election.

Career
Shapiro began his journalism career as Washington reporter for Congressional Quarterly (1969 to 1970). He has since written for a number of publications, including USA Today (serving as twice-weekly "Hype & Glory" columnist starting in 1995; The Washington Post, Time (senior writer from 1987 to 1993, covering Bill Clinton's 1992 presidential campaign), Newsweek (political writer, 1983 to 1987), Esquire (monthly "Our Man in the White House" column, 1993 to 1996), the Washington Monthly (editor, 1972 to 1976), Salon.com, and Politics Daily. Shapiro has also written for The American Prospect and been a columnist for Yahoo News and Roll Call.  Shapiro won the Society of Professional Journalists' 2010 Sigma Delta Chi Award in the category of Online Column Writing (Independent) for his piece "The Societal Costs of Our Shrill, Hyperactive and Partisan Media Culture," published in Politics Daily.

Shapiro was press secretary to U.S. Secretary of Labor Ray Marshall from 1977 to 1978. He was a speechwriter for President Jimmy Carter in 1979. He has covered nine United States presidential elections.

Shapiro completed a fellowship in Japan with the Japan Society and has been a member of the Council on Ideas of the Gihon Foundation since 1992.

Shapiro is a fellow at New York University's Brennan Center for Justice. Shapiro is also a lecturer in political science at Yale University.

Shapiro has written One-Car Caravan: On the Road with the 2004 Democrats Before America Tunes In (PublicAffairs, 2003) and Hustling Hitler: How a Jewish Vaudevillian Fooled the Fuhrer (Blue Rider Press, 2016).

Shapiro performed stand-up comedy for many years, and in 1998 The Times of London described him as "one of Manhattan's leading political satirists."  His columns have included satire as well.

Personal life
Shapiro is married to magazine writer Meryl Gordon and splits his time between New York City and Washington, D.C.

Notes

External links

American speechwriters
American male non-fiction writers
American male  journalists
Carter administration personnel
Living people
The Washington Post people
University of Michigan alumni
Yale University faculty
Writers from Norwalk, Connecticut
American satirists
Year of birth missing (living people)
The Michigan Daily alumni